Derek Terrion King (born 12 April 1980) is a Trinbagonian football manager and former player who serves as head coach of the Trinidad and Tobago national under-20 football team and as an assistant coach for the Trinidad and Tobago national football team.

Playing career
King was named in the team for 2000 CONCACAF Gold Cup and the 2005 Caribbean Cup. He made his international debut for Trinidad and Tobago against South Africa at the age of 19.

Coaching career

Joe Public
In 2009, King won his first league championship as a manager with Joe Public, also  winning the Trinidad and Tobago FA Trophy and Trinidad and Tobago Classic while being named TT Pro League Manager of the Year.

Trinidad and Tobago
From June 2013 until November 2016, King served as an assistant coach of the Trinidad and Tobago national team under Stephen Hart.

King was put in charge of the Trinidad and Tobago national under-20 football team for the 2015 CONCACAF U-20 Championship.

North East Stars
In 2017, King led North East Stars to the club's second-ever TT Pro League title.

King departed North East Stars in February 2018 after the league imposed a new wage structure which severely limited the salaries of players and technical staff.

Santa Rosa
On 3 April 2018, King joined TT Super League side Santa Rosa and led the club to a league championship that season. He was subsequently named the league's Coach of the Year.

HFX Wanderers
King joined Stephen Hart's coaching staff for HFX Wanderers's inaugural season in December 2018. In December 2019 King announced he was departing Halifax to return to Trinidad and Tobago.

Return to Trinidad and Tobago
Upon his departure from the HFX Wanderers King was announced as the new assistant coach for Trinidad and Tobago under Terry Fenwick. He will also serve as the head coach for the Trinidad and Tobago under-20 side.

Honours
Joe Public
TT Pro League: 2009
Trinidad and Tobago FA Trophy: 2009
Trinidad and Tobago Classic: 2009

North East Stars
TT Pro League: 2017

Santa Rosa
TT Super League: 2018

Individual
TT Pro League Manager of the Year: 2009
TT Super League Coach of the Year: 2018

References

1980 births
Living people
Association football defenders
Trinidad and Tobago footballers
People from Arima
Trinidad and Tobago international footballers
2000 CONCACAF Gold Cup players
Expatriate soccer managers in Canada
Joe Public F.C. managers
North East Stars F.C. managers
HFX Wanderers FC non-playing staff
Trinidad and Tobago football managers